The 1928 Cheltenham by-election was a parliamentary by-election held on 26 September 1928 for the British House of Commons constituency of Cheltenham in Gloucestershire.

The seat had become vacant when the constituency's Conservative Member of Parliament (MP), Sir James Agg-Gardner, had died on 9 August 1928, aged 81. He had held the seat since a by-election in 1911, having previously been Cheltenham's MP from 1874 to 1880, 1885 to 1895, and 1900 to 1906.

Candidates 
The Liberal Party selected 63-year old Sir John Brunner, a political veteran who had been MP for three previous constituencies, most recently Southport from 1923 to 1924.

The Conservative Party candidate was 53-year old Sir Walter Preston, who had been MP for Mile End from 1918 to 1923.  The Labour Party candidate was Florence Widdowson, aged 37.

Results 
Preston held the seat for the Conservatives with a comfortable majority of 3,760 votes over Brunner. He held the seat until his resignation from the House of Commons in 1937, triggering another by-election in Chelternham.

Widdowson unsuccessfully contested the Rushcliffe constituency in Nottingham in 1929 and again in 1931, the later time under her married name of Florence Paton. She did stand in 1935, but finally won the Rushcliffe seat at the 1945 general election.

Brunner did not stand for Parliament again.

Votes

See also
 Cheltenham constituency
 1911 Cheltenham by-election
 1937 Cheltenham by-election
 Cheltenham
 List of United Kingdom by-elections (1918–1931)
 United Kingdom by-election records

References
 

1928 in England
Politics of Cheltenham
1928 elections in the United Kingdom
By-elections to the Parliament of the United Kingdom in Gloucestershire constituencies
20th century in Gloucestershire